Duda Balje (born 16 October 1977) is a Kosovar Bosniak politician. A member of the Vakat Coalition, she served as a member of the Kosovan Assembly from 2001 to 2017. She chaired the Commission on Human Rights, Gender Equality, Missing Persons and Petitions. She declared on her Facebook page that she will vote against a new Civil Code that would legalize same-sex marriage. She decided to vote against because it does not match her religious beliefs.

Personal life 
Balje holds a Master of Science in business economics and a Ph.D. in human resources management.

She is married and has three children

Annotations

References

1977 births
Living people
People from Prizren
Kosovan women in politics
Kosovan people of Bosniak descent
Members of the Assembly of the Republic of Kosovo
21st-century women politicians
Politicians from Prizren